Bulgaria–Kosovo relations refer to the bilateral relations of Bulgaria and Kosovo.

Relations 

Kosovo declared independence from Serbia on 17 February 2008 and after an evenly split vote in the legislature, Bulgaria recognised it on 20 March 2008 despite objections from Russia. Bulgaria has an embassy in Pristina and Republic of Kosovo has opened its embassy in Sofia as of January 2010.

Throughout the Middle Ages, Kosovo had been part of the vast Bulgarian Empire.

Military 

Bulgaria currently has 48 troops serving in Kosovo as peacekeepers in the NATO led Kosovo Force.

ICJ 

Bulgaria supported Kosovo at the International Court of Justice's oral debate on the legality of Kosovo's independence.

See also 
 Bulgaria–Serbia relations
 Bulgaria–Yugoslavia relations
 Foreign relations of Bulgaria
 Foreign relations of Kosovo
 Kosovo, Plovdiv province

Notes

References  

 
Bilateral relations of Kosovo
Kosovo